In Turkey, the Directorate for EU Affairs is a government agency affiliated with the Ministry of Foreign Affairs. It was founded in 2018, following the formation of the new government and after the dissolution of the now-defunct Ministry of European Union Affairs. The directorate is responsible for the accession process between the Republic of Turkey and the European Union. Deputy minister of foreign affairs, Faruk Kaymakcı, has been serving as the agency's president since 2018.

List of presidents

References 

Ministry of Foreign Affairs (Turkey)
Government agencies of Turkey